Han Sun-il (born 18 January 1985) is a North Korean former footballer. He represented North Korea on at least two occasions in 2005.

Career statistics

International

References

1985 births
Living people
North Korean footballers
North Korea international footballers
Association football midfielders